The Alabama Crimson Tide college football team competes as part of the National Collegiate Athletic Association (NCAA) Division I Football Bowl Subdivision (FBS), and represents the University of Alabama in the Western Division of the Southeastern Conference (SEC). All-America selections are individual player recognitions made after each season when numerous publications release lists of their ideal team. The NCAA recognizes five All-America lists: the Associated Press (AP), American Football Coaches Association (AFCA), the Football Writers Association of America (FWAA), Sporting News (TSN), and the Walter Camp Football Foundation (WC). In order for an honoree to earn a "consensus" selection, he must be selected as first team in three of the five lists recognized by the NCAA, and "unanimous" selections must be selected as first team in all five lists.

Since the establishment of the team in 1892, Alabama has had 149 players honored a total of 173 times as First Team All-America for their performance on the field of play. Included in these selections are 84 consensus selections, 41 of which were unanimous selections. In 2009, Alabama set both a school and national record for AP All-Americans with six first team selections. The most recent All-Americans from Alabama came after the 2022 season, when Will Anderson Jr., was named first-team All-America by various selectors. 

Alabama had six players earn first team All-America honors from the WCFF in 2020, the most in the history of Walter Camp voting.

Alabama's 2020 roster features seven first team All-Americans to tie the 2011 roster for the most first-teamers in a single season in program history. The five unanimous selections are the most in program history, surpassing the previous high of three by the 2016 squad. That total also matches the NCAA single-season mark by one team, tying the 2003 Oklahoma roster.

Key

Selectors

Selections

Notes

References
General
 
 
 

Specific

Alabama Crimson Tide

Alabama Crimson Tide football All-Americans